Cassiopeia A (Cas A) is a supernova remnant (SNR) in the constellation Cassiopeia and the brightest extrasolar radio source in the sky at frequencies above 1 GHz. It has been seen in wavelengths of visible light with amateur telescopes down to 234 mm (9.25 in) with filters.

It is estimated that light from the supernova itself first reached Earth near the 1690s, although there are no definitively corresponding records from then. Cas A is circumpolar at and above mid-Northern latitudes which had extensive records and basic telescopes. Its likely omission in records is probably due to interstellar dust absorbing optical wavelength radiation before it reached Earth (although it is possible that it was recorded as a sixth magnitude star 3 Cassiopeiae by John Flamsteed on 16 August 1680). Possible explanations lean toward the idea that the source star was unusually massive and had previously ejected much of its outer layers. These outer layers would have cloaked the star and re-absorbed much of the light released as the inner star collapsed.

Cas A was among the first discrete astronomical radio sources found. Its discovery was reported in 1948 by Martin Ryle and Francis Graham-Smith, astronomers at Cambridge, based on observations with the Long Michelson Interferometer. The optical component was first identified in 1950.

Possible observations 
Calculations working back from the currently observed expansion point to an explosion that would have become visible on Earth around 1667. Astronomer William Ashworth and others have suggested that the Astronomer Royal John Flamsteed may have inadvertently observed the supernova on 16 August 1680, when he catalogued a star near its position. Another suggestion from recent cross-disciplinary research is that the supernova was the "noon day star", observed in 1630, that was thought to have heralded the birth of Charles II, the future monarch of Great Britain. At any rate, no supernova occurring within the Milky Way has been visible to the naked eye from Earth since.

Expansion
The expansion shell has a temperature of around 30 million K, and is expanding at 4000−6000 km/s.

Observations of the exploded star through the Hubble Space Telescope have shown that, despite the original belief that the remnants were expanding in a uniform manner, there are high velocity outlying eject knots moving with transverse velocities of 5,500−14,500 km/s with the highest speeds occurring in two nearly opposing jets. When the view of the expanding star uses colors to differentiate materials of different chemical compositions, it shows that similar materials often remain gathered together in the remnants of the explosion.

Radio source
Because the supernova remnant is cooling, its flux density is decreasing. This decrease means that, at frequencies below 1 GHz, Cas A is now less intense than Cygnus A. Cas A is still the brightest extrasolar radio source in the sky at frequencies above 1 GHz.

X-ray source
Although Cas X-1 (or Cas XR-1), the apparent first X-ray source in the constellation Cassiopeia was not detected during the 16 June 1964, Aerobee sounding rocket flight, it was considered as a possible source. Cas A was scanned during another Aerobee rocket flight of 1 October 1964, but no significant X-ray flux above background was associated with the position. Cas XR-1 was discovered by an Aerobee rocket flight on 25 April 1965, at RA  Dec . Cas X-1 is Cas A, a Type II SNR at RA  Dec .
The designations Cassiopeia X-1, Cas XR-1, Cas X-1 are no longer used, but the X-ray source is Cas A (SNR G111.7-02.1) at 2U 2321+58.

In 1999, the Chandra X-Ray Observatory found CXOU J232327.8+584842, a "hot point-like source" close to the center of the nebula that is the neutron star remnant left by the explosion.

Supernova reflected echo

In 2005 an infrared echo of the Cassiopeia A explosion was observed on nearby gas clouds using Spitzer Space Telescope. The infrared echo was also seen by IRAS and studied with the Infrared Spectrograph. Previously it was suspected that a flare in 1950 from a central pulsar could be responsible for the infrared echo. With the new data it was concluded that this is unlikely the case and that the infrared echo was caused by thermal emission by dust, which was heated by the radiative output of the supernova during the shock breakout. The infrared echo is accompanied by a scattered light echo. The recorded spectrum of the optical light echo proved the supernova was of Type IIb, meaning it resulted from the internal collapse and violent explosion of a massive star, most probably a red supergiant with a helium core which had lost almost all of its hydrogen envelope. This was the first observation of the light echo of a supernova whose explosion had not been directly observed which opens up the possibility of studying and reconstructing past astronomical events. In 2011 a study used spectra from different positions of the light echo to confirm that the Cassiopeia A supernova was asymmetric.

Phosphorus detection 
In 2013, astronomers detected phosphorus in Cassiopeia A, which confirmed that this element is produced in supernovae through supernova nucleosynthesis. The phosphorus-to-iron ratio in material from the supernova remnant could be up to 100 times higher than in the Milky Way in general.

Gallery

See also
 List of supernova remnants
 Light echo

References

External links

 
 
 

1947 in science
461
Cassiopeia (constellation)
Milky Way
Supernova remnants
16800816
?